This is a list of 341 species in Bombylius, a genus of bee flies in the family Bombyliidae.

Bombylius species

 Bombylius aaroni Baez, 1983 c g
 Bombylius abominalis Wiedemann, 1828 c g
 Bombylius acrophylax Greathead, 1991 c g
 Bombylius aestivus Johnson and Johnson, 1975 i c g
 Bombylius agilis Olivier, 1789 c g
 Bombylius aksarayensis Hasbenli & Zaitzev, 2000 c g
 Bombylius albaminis Seguy, 1949 c g
 Bombylius albicapillus Loew, 1872 i c g b
 Bombylius albopenicillatoides (Hall and Evenhuis, 1981) i c g
 Bombylius albopenicillatus Bigot, 1892 i c g
 Bombylius albosparsus Bigot, 1892 c g
 Bombylius aleophilus (Hall and Evenhuis, 1981) i c g
 Bombylius alexanderi Paramonov, 1940 c g
 Bombylius altaicus Paramonov, 1940 c g
 Bombylius altimyia Hall and Evenhuis, 1980 i c g
 Bombylius altivolans Francois, 1969 c g
 Bombylius ambustus Pallas & Wiedemann, 1818 c g
 Bombylius analis Olivier, 1789 c g
 Bombylius angulatus Macquart, 1826 c g
 Bombylius antennipilosus Paramonov, 1926 c g
 Bombylius anthophilus Evenhius, 1983 i c g b
 Bombylius anthophoroides Evenhuis, 1977 i c g
 Bombylius apertus (Macquart, 1847) c g
 Bombylius apulus (Cyrillus, 1791) c g
 Bombylius ardens Walker, 1849 c g
 Bombylius arenosus Paramonov, 1940 c g
 Bombylius argentarius Seguy, 1934 c g
 Bombylius argentifacies Austen, 1937 c g
 Bombylius arizonicus Hall, 1980 i c g
 Bombylius armeniacus Paramonov, 1925 c g
 Bombylius atriceps Loew, 1863 i c g b
 Bombylius atropos (Thunberg, 1789) c g
 Bombylius audcenti Bowden, 1984 c g
 Bombylius aureocookae Evenhuis, 1984 i c g
 Bombylius aureus (Evenhuis, 1977) i c g
 Bombylius aurifer Osten Sacken, 1877 i c g b
 Bombylius auriferoides Johnson and Johnson, 1975 i c g
 Bombylius austini Painter, 1933 i c g
 Bombylius axillaris Meigen, 1830 c g
 Bombylius aztec Evenhuis, 1984 i c g
 Bombylius balion Hall and Evenhuis, 1980 i c g
 Bombylius ballmeri Hall and Evenhuis, 1980 i c g
 Bombylius basifumatus Speiser, 1914 c g
 Bombylius bathi Evenhuis i
 Bombylius bedouinus Efflatoun, 1945 c g
 Bombylius bellus (Philippi, 1865) c g
 Bombylius bicolor (Loew, 1861) c g
 Bombylius boharti Evenhuis, 1984 i c g
 Bombylius breviabdominalis Evenhuis, 1977 i c g b
 Bombylius brevirostris Olivier, 1789 c g
 Bombylius brunettii Senior-White, 1922 c g
 Bombylius cachinnans Osten Sacken, 1877 i c g
 Bombylius c-album Evenhuis, 1984 i c g
 Bombylius californicus Evenhuis and Tabet, 1981 i c g
 Bombylius callopterus Loew, 1855 c g
 Bombylius calus (Hall and Evenhuis, 1981) i c g
 Bombylius canadensis Curran, 1933 i c g
 Bombylius candidifrons Austen, 1937 c g
 Bombylius candidus Loew, 1855 c g
 Bombylius canescens Mikan, 1796 c g
 Bombylius capensis Linnaeus, 1764 c g
 Bombylius chinensis Paramonov, 1931 c g
 Bombylius cinerarius Pallas & Wiedemann, 1818 c g
 Bombylius cinerascens Mikan, 1796 c g
 Bombylius cinereus Olivier, 1789 c g
 Bombylius cinerivus Painter, 1962 i c g
 Bombylius cirrhopus Evenhuis, 1978 c g
 Bombylius citrinus Loew, 1855 c g
 Bombylius clio Williston, 1901 i c g
 Bombylius coahuilensis (Hall and Evenhuis, 1981) i c g
 Bombylius collaris Becker, 1906 c g
 Bombylius comanche Painter, 1962 i c g b
 Bombylius comastes Brunetti, 1909 c g
 Bombylius coquilletti Williston, 1899 i c g b
 Bombylius crassitarsis Paramonov, 1940 c g
 Bombylius cruciatus Fabricius, 1798 c g
 Bombylius curtirhynchus Evenhuis, 1978 i c g b
 Bombylius debilis Loew, 1855 c g
 Bombylius depictus Milne Edwards, 1828 c g
 Bombylius deserticola Paramonov, 1940 c g
 Bombylius desertivagus Paramonov, 1940 c g
 Bombylius diagonalis Wiedemann, 1820 c g
 Bombylius dichoptus Hall, 1976 c g
 Bombylius diegoensis Painter, 1933 i c g b
 Bombylius dimidiatus Macquart, 1840 c g
 Bombylius discolor Mikan, 1796 c g
 Bombylius dolorosus Williston, 1901 c g
 Bombylius dolorsus Williston, 1901 i c g
 Bombylius dorsalis Olivier, 1789 c g
 Bombylius duncani Painter, 1940 i c g
 Bombylius eboreus Painter, 1940 i c g
 Bombylius efflatounbeyi Evenhuis, 1978 c g
 Bombylius elbayensis Efflatoun, 1945 c g
 Bombylius elongatus Rossi, 1794 c g
 Bombylius eploceus Seguy, 1949 c g
 Bombylius erectus Brunetti, 1909 c g
 Bombylius erythrocerus Bezzi, 1901 c g
 Bombylius exiguus Walker, 1871 c g
 Bombylius facialis Cresson, 1919 i c g
 Bombylius fallax Austen, 1937 c g
 Bombylius favillaceus Meigen, 1820 c g
 Bombylius femoralis Bezzi, 1924 c g
 Bombylius fimbratus Meigen, 1820 c g
 Bombylius fimbriatus Meigen, 1820 g
 Bombylius fisheri Evenhuis, 1984 i c g
 Bombylius flavicalcaratus Lindner, 1979 c g
 Bombylius flavifacies Hall and Evenhuis, 1980 i c g
 Bombylius flavipes Wiedemann, 1828 g
 Bombylius flavipilosus Cole, 1923 i c g
 Bombylius flaviplosus Cole, 1923 c g
 Bombylius flavissimus Greathead, 1980 c g
 Bombylius floccosus Loew, 1857 g
 Bombylius forbesi Evenhuis, 1983 c g
 Bombylius fraudator Greathead, 1991 c g
 Bombylius fraudulentus Johnson, 1907 i c g b
 Bombylius frommerorum Hall and Evenhuis, 1980 i c g
 Bombylius fulvescens Wiedemann, 1820 g
 Bombylius fulvibasoides Painter, 1962 i c g b
 Bombylius fulvipes Villers, 1789 c g
 Bombylius fulvonotatus Wiedemann, 1818 c g
 Bombylius fulvulus Evenhuis & Greathead, 1999 c g
 Bombylius fulvus (Hall & Evenhuis, 1981) c g
 Bombylius fumosus Dufour, 1852 c g
 Bombylius fuscus Fabricius, 1781 c g
 Bombylius gossyporrhus Evenhuis, 1984 i c g
 Bombylius goyaz (Macquart, 1840) c g
 Bombylius gracilipes Becker, 1906 c g
 Bombylius grandiosus Evenhuis, 1984 i c g
 Bombylius haemorrhoicum (Loew, 1863) c g
 Bombylius haemorrhoidalis Bezzi, 1921 c g
 Bombylius halli Evenhuis and Tabet, 1981 i c g
 Bombylius haywardi Edwards, 1937 c g
 Bombylius helvus Wiedemann, 1821 i c g b
 Bombylius hesychastes (Hall and Evenhuis, 1981) i c g
 Bombylius heximaculatus Loew, 1872 b
 Bombylius hololeucus Loew, 1873 c g
 Bombylius horni Paramonov, 1931 c g
 Bombylius hypoxantha Loew, 1863 c g
 Bombylius incanus Johnson, 1907 i c g b
 Bombylius incognitus Evenhuis & Greathead, 1999 c g
 Bombylius inconspicus Greathead, 1967 c g
 Bombylius insularis (Bigot, 1857) c g
 Bombylius io Williston, 1901 i c g
 Bombylius iphiculus (Hall & Evenhuis, 1981) i c g b
 Bombylius iranicus Paramonov, 1940 c g
 Bombylius japygus Hall and Evenhuis, 1980 i c g
 Bombylius kanabensis Johnson and Johnson, 1975 i c g
 Bombylius kirgizorum Zaitzev, 1989 c g
 Bombylius koreanus Paramonov, 1926 c g
 Bombylius kozlovi Paramonov, 1926 c g
 Bombylius kugleri Zaitzev, 1995 c g
 Bombylius kutshurganicus Paramonov, 1926 c g
 Bombylius lancifer Osten Sacken, 1877 i c g b
 Bombylius landbecki Philippi, 1865 c g
 Bombylius lassenensis Painter, 1965 i c g
 Bombylius leberi Evenhuis, 1984 i c g
 Bombylius lejostomus Loew, 1855 c g
 Bombylius leucopygus Macquart, 1846 c g
 Bombylius loriae (Evenhuis, 1977) c g
 Bombylius lusitanicus Meigen, 1830 c g
 Bombylius luteolus Evenhuis, 1978 c g
 Bombylius macfarlandi Evenhuis, 1985 i c g
 Bombylius maculatus Fabricius, 1775 c g
 Bombylius maculithorax Paramonov, 1926 c g
 Bombylius maculosus (Painter, 1926) i c g
 Bombylius magnificus Evenhuis, 1980 c g
 Bombylius major Linnaeus, 1758 i c g b  (greater bee fly)
 Bombylius marebensis Greathead, 1967 c g
 Bombylius marginatus (Cyrillus, 1792) c g
 Bombylius marilynae Evenhuis, 1984 i c g
 Bombylius massaurensis Greathead, 1967 c g
 Bombylius mauritanus Olivier, 1789 c g
 Bombylius maurus Olivier, 1789 c g
 Bombylius medius Linnæus, 1758 c g
 Bombylius medorae Painter, 1940 i c g
 Bombylius meigeni Evenhuis & Greathead, 1999 c g
 Bombylius melanopygus Bigot, 1861 c g
 Bombylius mendax Austen, 1937 c g
 Bombylius metopium Osten Sacken, 1877 i c g
 Bombylius mexicanus Wiedemann, 1821 i c g b
 Bombylius micropsarus Evenhuis, 1980 c g
 Bombylius minor Linnæus, 1758 c g
 Bombylius mobilis Loew, 1873 c g
 Bombylius moctezuma Hall and Evenhuis i
 Bombylius modestoides Bowden, 1975 c g
 Bombylius modestus Loew, 1873 c g
 Bombylius mohavensis Evenhuis, 1975 i c g b
 Bombylius montanus Johnson and Johnson, 1975 i c g
 Bombylius montium Francois, 1955 c g
 Bombylius morelos Evenhuis & Greathead, 1999 c g
 Bombylius morio Olivier, 1789 c g
 Bombylius morosus Meijere, 1913 c g
 Bombylius moussayensis Efflatoun, 1945 c g
 Bombylius mus Bigot, 1862 c g
 Bombylius narynensis Zaitzev, 1989 c g
 Bombylius navajo (Hall and Evenhius) i g
 Bombylius neithokris Jaennicke, 1867 c g
 Bombylius neopallidus Hall and Evenhuis i
 Bombylius neopulcher Hall and Evenhuis i
 Bombylius neotropicus Evenhuis, 1984 c g
 Bombylius nephthys (Hall and Evenhuis, 1980) i c g
 Bombylius nevadensis Hall and Evenhuis, 1980 i c g
 Bombylius nicholsonae Hall and Evenhuis, 1980 i c g
 Bombylius nigricolor Francois, 1969 c g
 Bombylius nigripes Macquart, 1834 c g
 Bombylius nigriventris Johnson and Johnson, 1975 i c g
 Bombylius nigrofemoratus Painter i c g
 Bombylius niveus Meigen, 1804 c g
 Bombylius nubilus Mikan, 1796 c g
 Bombylius nudus Villers, 1789 c g
 Bombylius numidus Macquart, 1846 c g
 Bombylius obliquus Brullé, 1833 c g
 Bombylius obscuripennis Paramonov, 1929 c g
 Bombylius oceanus Becker, 1908 c g
 Bombylius ochraceus Bigot, 1892 c g
 Bombylius olgae Zaitzev, 1995 c g
 Bombylius olivierii Macquart, 1840 c g
 Bombylius olsufjevi Paramonov, 1940 c g
 Bombylius orientalis Macquart, 1840 c g
 Bombylius ovatus Hall, 1976 c g
 Bombylius painteri Evenhuis, 1978 i c g
 Bombylius painterorum (Hall and Evenhuis, 1981) i c g
 Bombylius pallens Wiedemann, 1820 c g
 Bombylius pallidicruris Brullé, 1833 c g
 Bombylius pallidipilus Greathead, 1967 c g
 Bombylius pallidus Abbassian-Lintzen, 1965 c g
 Bombylius pamiricus Zaitzev, 1989 c g
 Bombylius paradoxus (Hall and Evenhuis, 1981) i c g
 Bombylius pardalotus Francois, 1969 c g
 Bombylius pauli Zaitzev, 2003 c g
 Bombylius pendens Cole and Lovett, 1919 i c g
 Bombylius pericaustus Loew, 1873 c g
 Bombylius persicus Paramonov, 1926 c g
 Bombylius phaeopterus Bezzi, 1924 c g
 Bombylius phlogmodes Evenhuis, 1984 i c g
 Bombylius pintuarius Baez, 1983 c g
 Bombylius plichtai Hall and Evenhuis, 1980 i c g
 Bombylius plumipes Drury, 1773 c g
 Bombylius podagricus Paramonov, 1940 c g
 Bombylius polius Zaitzev, 2004 c g
 Bombylius polypogon Loew, 1855 c g
 Bombylius posticus Fabricius, 1805 c g
 Bombylius postversicolor Evenhuis & Greathead, 1999 c g
 Bombylius primogenitus Walker, 1849 c g
 Bombylius probellus Hardy, 1942 c g
 Bombylius propinquus Brunetti, 1909 c g
 Bombylius proximocruciatus Abbassian-Lintzen, 1965 c g
 Bombylius pulchellus Loew, 1863 i c g b
 Bombylius pulcher (Painter, 1926) i c g
 Bombylius pulcherrimus Evenhuis & Greathead, 1999 c g
 Bombylius pumilus Meigen, 1820 c g
 Bombylius punctipennis Loew, 1855 c g
 Bombylius pusiellus Evenhuis & Greathead, 1999 c g
 Bombylius pygmaeus Fabricius, 1781 i c g b
 Bombylius pyrrhothrix (Hall and Evenhuis, 1981) i c g
 Bombylius quadricolor Evenhuis, 1984 i c g
 Bombylius quadrifarius Loew, 1855 c g
 Bombylius queretaroensis Evenhuis & Greathead, 1999 c g
 Bombylius quirinus Evenhuis, 1984 i c g
 Bombylius ravus Loew, 1863 i c g
 Bombylius recedens Walker, 1852 c g
 Bombylius reginae Evenhuis, 1984 c g
 Bombylius repeteki Paramonov, 1940 c g
 Bombylius rhea Evenhuis, 1984 i c g
 Bombylius rhodius Loew, 1855 c g
 Bombylius roonwali Zaitzev, 1988 c g
 Bombylius rossicus Evenhuis & Greathead, 1999 c g
 Bombylius rufiventris Macquart, 1846 c g
 Bombylius rufum Olivier, 1789 c g
 Bombylius ruizi Edwards, 1937 c g
 Bombylius ruoanalis Macqaurt, 1850 c g
 Bombylius rutilous (Hall. 1975) i c g
 Bombylius rutilus (Hall, 1975) i g
 Bombylius saudiensis Greathead, 1980 c g
 Bombylius schaeuffelei Lindner, 1979 c g
 Bombylius semifuscus Meigen, 1820 c g
 Bombylius seminiger Becker, 1906 c g
 Bombylius semirufus (Loew, 1872) c g
 Bombylius senilis (Fabricius, 1794) c g
 Bombylius septentrionalis (Hall and Evenhuis, 1981) i c g
 Bombylius shah Paramonov, 1940 c g
 Bombylius shelkovnikovi Paramonov, 1926 c g
 Bombylius shibakawae Matsumura, 1916 c g
 Bombylius sierra Evenhuis & Greathead, 1999 c g
 Bombylius silvus Cole and Lovett, 1919 i c g
 Bombylius similis (Modeer, 1786) c g
 Bombylius simplicipennis Bezzi, 1924 c g
 Bombylius simulans Austen, 1937 c g
 Bombylius socotrae Greathead, 1969 c g
 Bombylius spinipes Thomson, 1869 c g
 Bombylius spinulosus Hasbenli & Zaitzev, 2000 c g
 Bombylius striatifrons Becker, 1906 c g
 Bombylius subacutus Hesse, 1938 c g
 Bombylius subflavus (Painter, 1926) i c g
 Bombylius submaculosus (Hall and Evenhuis, 1981) i c g
 Bombylius succandidus Roberts, 1928 c g
 Bombylius suffusa Walker, 1849 c g
 Bombylius susianae Abbassian-Lintzen, 1965 c g
 Bombylius sylphae Evenhuis, 1984 i c g
 Bombylius syndesmus (Coquillett, 1894) i c
 Bombylius syrinx Evenhuis, 1980 c g
 Bombylius sytshuanensis Paramonov, 1926 c g
 Bombylius taxcoensis Hall & Evenhuis, 1981 c g
 Bombylius taxconesis (Hall and Evenhuis, 1981) i c g
 Bombylius tephroleucus Loew, 1855 c g
 Bombylius terminalis Brunetti, 1909 c g
 Bombylius testaceiventris Paramonov, 1925 c g
 Bombylius texanus Painter, 1933 i c g b
 Bombylius thapsinoides Evenhuis, 1978 c g
 Bombylius torquatus Loew, 1855 c g
 Bombylius trichurus Pallas, 1818 c g
 Bombylius tripudians Bezzi, 1924 c g
 Bombylius tuckeri Hesse, 1938 c g
 Bombylius turanicus Paramonov, 1926 c g
 Bombylius turcmenicus Paramonov, 1926 c g
 Bombylius uniformis Paramonov, 1955 c g
 Bombylius ushinskii Paramonov, 1940 c g
 Bombylius uzbekorum Paramonov, 1926 c g
 Bombylius vagabundus Meigen, 1830 c g
 Bombylius vagans Meigen, 1830 c g
 Bombylius valdivianus Rondani, 1863 c g
 Bombylius validus Loew, 1863 i c g b
 Bombylius vallicola Evenhuis and Tabet, 1981 i c g
 Bombylius vansoni Hesse, 1936 c g
 Bombylius varius Fabricius, 1805 i c g b
 Bombylius venosus Mikan, 1796 c g
 Bombylius vittatus (Painter, 1926) i c g
 Bombylius vlasovi Paramonov, 1940 c g
 Bombylius wadensis Efflatoun, 1945 c g
 Bombylius walkeri Evenhuis, 1978 c g
 Bombylius washingtoniensis Evenhuis, 1978 i c g
 Bombylius watanabei Matsumura, 1916 c g
 Bombylius waterbergensis Hesse, 1938 c g
 Bombylius willistoni Evenhuis, 1984 i c g
 Bombylius xanthinus Evenhuis & Greathead, 1999 c g
 Bombylius xanthothrix Evenhuis, 1978 i c g
 Bombylius zapataensis Evenhuis, 1984 i c g
 Bombylius zarudnyi Paramonov, 1940 c g
 Bombylius zephyr Evenhuis & Greathead, 1999 c g
 Bombylius zircon Evenhuis, 1984 i c g
 Bombylius zonicus Evenhuis & Greathead, 1999 c g

Data sources: i = ITIS, c = Catalogue of Life, g = GBIF, b = Bugguide.net

References

Bombylius